Indra is a village in Junagdh District in the state of Gujarat, India. It is located 41 km towards west from District headquarters Junagadh.

As of 2001 India census, there were 1685 people residing in Indra.  There were 842 males and 843 females, thus males constitute 49.97% of population and females 50.03%.  Indra has an average literacy rate of 76.88%. The PIN Code of Indra is 362640 and postal head office is Sardargadh.

Temples in Indra 
1. Ram Mandir (Ram Mandir-Choro)

2. Ramapir temple

Neares villages and city 
Vada ( 4 km ), Gana ( 4 km ), Bhindora ( 4 km ), Buri ( 5 km ), Sherdi ( 3 km ) are the nearby Villages to Indra. Indra is surrounded by Kutiyana Taluka towards west, Upleta Taluka towards North, Vanthali Taluka towards East, Dhoraji Taluka towards East .

Manavadar, Bantwa, Upleta, Keshod, Junagadh are the nearby Cities to Indra.

Politics in Indra 
INC, BJP are the major political parties in this area.

Colleges near Indra 
Shri Arjun Arts And Bsw.brs.bca College.supasi
Address : At.supasi Ta.veraval dis.junagadh
Bahauddin Science College (junagadh)
Address : Bahauddin Science College. near Bhut Nath Temple. junagadh.
S. R. Vasani School Of Management
Address : Ravna Valo Dhoro
Nakum M.r Arts And Science College
Address : Matana Ta Sutrapada Dist Junagadh
Shri Karmyogi Arts And Comm.college Gadu
Address : Om Santi Nagar Khera Road
Indra Prathamik Shala(Primary school)
Address : indra, manavadar, junagadh, Gujarat . PIN- 362640, Post - Sardargadh

References

Villages in Junagadh district